Onzell Andre "Rudy" Harris (born September 18, 1971) is a former American football player.  Harris first gained attention as a running back for Brockton High School.  He attended Clemson University, where he played football 1990 to 1992.  He was drafted by the Tampa Bay Buccaneers in the fourth round (91st overall pick) of the 1993 NFL Draft.  He played in the National Football League for the Tampa Bay Buccaneers in 1993 and 1994.  He had his first start in an NFL game against the San Francisco 49ers in November 1993 and had a 25-yard pass reception in the game.  After spending two seasons with the Buccaneers, Harris was released in August 1995.  He played in 18 games in the NFL, two as a starter.  In his two NFL seasons, he rushed for 29 yards on nine carries and caught six passes for 59 yards.

References

American football running backs
Sportspeople from Brockton, Massachusetts
Players of American football from Massachusetts
Tampa Bay Buccaneers players
Living people
1971 births
Clemson Tigers football players